Snuggerud Glacier is a glacier flowing north-northeast between Klevekapa Mountain and Smaknoltane Peaks in the Filchner Mountains of Queen Maud Land. Mapped by Norwegian cartographers from surveys and air photos by the Norwegian Antarctic Expedition (1956–60) and named for J. Snuggerud, radio mechanic with Norwegian Antarctic Expedition (1956–58).

See also
 Djupedalsleitet Saddle
 List of glaciers in the Antarctic
 Glaciology

References
 

Glaciers of Queen Maud Land
Princess Astrid Coast